Express II may refer to:

 Express Airlines II - a US airline
 SS Express II (1909) - a Swedish steamship dating from 1909